The Reverend Robert Anderson Jardine (1878–1950), who published a memoir as R. Anderson Jardine, was an ordained priest of the Church of England and vicar of a parish in Darlington in the north of England.  He is best known for performing the marriage ceremony of the Duke of Windsor and his fiancée Wallis Simpson, who thus became the Duchess of Windsor, in June 1937; this was a marriage that was seen as scandalous at the time. Jardine's offer to carry out the wedding, as a sacrament of a church which opposed it, cost him his career in England.

An unprecedented marriage
Following his abdication from the thrones of all his kingdoms and dominions in December 1936, the Duke of Windsor left England immediately to start the process of marrying Wallis Simpson, "the woman he loved".  This process awaited the conclusion of a legally required six-month period to allow the completion of Simpson's divorce from her husband Ernest Simpson.  Following the conclusion of this period, it was the former King's strong desire to be married to Wallis under the auspices of the Church of England, the church of which he had been Supreme Governor.  However, it was Church law at the time to forbid the re-marriage of divorced partners.

The dilemma facing the Duke and his fiancée was heavily covered at the time in the British and European press.  A hitherto obscure vicar from the North of England, the Rev. Robert Jardine, publicly volunteered to perform the ceremony.  Press supporters of the wedding called Jardine, whose working-class parish was dominated by heavy industry, the "poor man's pastor".  The marriage was set for 3 June 1937 in the Château de Candé, Wallis's French home in exile.

The Reverend and Mrs Jardine, with their 19-year-old son, Donald, left Darlington on Monday 31 May, but Mrs Jardine and Donald stayed with relations in Letchworth, while Jardine crossed the Channel. The Bishop of Durham, Dr Herbert Hensley Henson, warned Jardine by telegram that he was “without episcopal licence or consent to unite the Duke of Windsor and Mrs. Simpson.”  The bishop did not have jurisdiction over Jardine's celebration of the sacraments while on the Continent, and under the immediate circumstances had no choice but to presume that the vicar had the permission of the Anglican bishop with jurisdiction.

J. A. Kensit, a leader of the Protestant Truth Society, to which Jardine belonged, commented “Mr Jardine is quite fearless in his advocacy of any cause which he judges right and would pursue his own line regardless of the consequences to himself."

The wedding was boycotted by almost the entire British establishment, and a small number of guests and a single pool reporter witnessed the wedding, which was conducted by Jardine "in a strong voice".  Following the brief ceremony, the couple departed for a honeymoon in Austria, and Jardine returned home to Darlington, unsuccessfully attempting to return to his duties in his parish.  However, he was soon made aware that he had performed an act which the church could not accept.  His vestry committee resigned, and he was encouraged to follow them.  Under pressure, he left England and attempted to emigrate to California.  In 1943 Jardine published a memoir, At Long Last, of the unusual event.

The marriage ceremony of the Duke and Duchess was not deemed to be a royal wedding.  Letters patent, published just before the ceremony in the London Gazette as the Depriving Act of 1937, explicitly stated that the title of Royal Highness, which conveyed precedence, would be enjoyed by the Duke but not by the Duchess.

Later life
Jardine's short-lived attempt to emigrate to California found him little work, while he tried unsuccessfully to capitalise on his fleeting fame. Some public statements which he made to American audiences — to the effect that he judged that there were circumstances in which the Duke of Windsor might have the Throne restored to him, and referring to Archbishop of Canterbury Cosmo Lang as "an ecclesiastical cad" — were seen as inflammatory. While the Nazi threat increased, he also went to the Duchess of Windsor's hometown of Baltimore, Maryland and declared that the Duke of Windsor was a champion of peace in Europe. He ministered for a short while at a Downtown Hollywood church named the 'Windsor Cathedral' — which Jardine designated a 'shrine to love'  — but because of visa problems was obliged to leave the United States. He and his wife Maud spent most of the war years in Mexico, penniless. He was finally offered a church post in South Africa; they returned to the UK to settle their affairs there, but he died suddenly in Bedford in March 1950 before he could take up the new post. He is buried in an unmarked grave there, reportedly by the press unknown even to his family.

See also

Abdication of Edward VIII

References

1878 births
1950 deaths
20th-century English Anglican priests
Abdication of Edward VIII
People from Darlington